Aleksandra Nikolayevna Pakhmutova (born 9 November 1929) is a Soviet and Russian composer. She has remained one of the best-known figures in Soviet and later Russian popular music since she first achieved fame in her homeland in the 1960s. She was awarded the People's Artist of the USSR in 1984.

Biography 
She was born on November 9, 1929 in Beketovka (now a neighborhood in Volgograd), Russian SFSR, Soviet Union, and began playing the piano and composing music at an early age. She was admitted to the prestigious Moscow Conservatory and graduated in 1953. In 1956, she completed a post-graduate course led by composer Vissarion Shebalin.

Her career is notable for her success in a range of different genres. She has composed pieces for the symphony orchestra (The Russian Suite, the concerto for the trumpet and the orchestra, the Youth Overture, the concerto for the orchestra); the ballet Illumination; music for children (cantatas, a series of choir pieces, and numerous songs); and songs and music for over a dozen different movies from Out of This World in 1958 to Because of Mama in 2001.

She is best known for some of her 400 songs, including such enduringly popular songs as The Melody, Russian Waltz, Tenderness, Hope, The Old Maple Tree, The Song of the Perturbed Youth, a series of the Gagarin Constellation, The Bird of Happiness (from the 1981 film O Sport, You – the world!, whose the song is subsequently very known in both Russia and China when performed by Russian singer Vitas since 2003) and Good-Bye Moscow which was used as the farewell tune of the 22nd Olympic Games in Moscow. Tenderness was used with great effect in Tatyana Lioznova's 1967 film Three Poplars in Plyushchikha. Her husband, the eminent Soviet-era poet Nikolai Dobronravov, contributed lyrics to her music on occasion, including songs used in three films.

One of her most famous ballads is Belovezhskaya Pushcha, composed in 1975, which celebrates Białowieża Forest, a last remnant of the European wildwood split now between Poland and Belarus. Another much-aired song was Malaya Zemlya, about a minor outpost where the then Soviet leader Leonid Brezhnev served as a political commissar during World War II.

Alexandra Pakhmutova found favor with the state establishment as well as the public. Reputedly Brezhnev's favorite composer, she received several Government Awards and State Prizes and served as the Secretary of the USSR and Russian Unions of Composers. She was named a Hero of Socialist Labour in 1990. Her name was given to Asteroid # 1889, registered by the planetary centre in Cincinnati, Ohio, United States.

Personal life
In 1956, Pakhmutova married an actor and poet Nikolai Dobronravov. He was assigned by the radio officials to work with her as a lyricist on a children's tune "Little Motor Boat" (Lodochka motornaya). They have written a lot of songs for children but the couple didn't have children of their own.

Compositions

Songs 
(Pakhmutova is accredited with composing over 500 individual songs and thus, only the most well-known are listed here)
 "Надежда" ("Nadezhda") 
 "Песня о тревожной молодости" ("Song Of Restless Youth) 
 "Мелодия" ("Melody") 
 "Беловежская пуща" ("Belovezhskaya Forest") 
 "Нежность" ("Tenderness") 
 "Команда молодости нашей" ("Our Youth Team") 
 "Старый клён" ("Old Maple")
 "Как молоды мы были" ("How Young We Were") 
 "Трус не играет в хоккей" ("No Coward Plays Hockey") 
 "И вновь продолжается бой" ("And the Battle Is Going Again")

Vocal Cycles 

 Gagarin's Constellation
 Songs about Lenin
 Aiga Stars
 Motherland
 Hugging the Sky

Orchestral 
 1953: Russian Suite for symphony orchestra 
"Ode to Lighting the Fire" (for mixed choir and symphony orchestra).
1957: Music for children: Suite "Lenin in our heart"
1972: Heroes of Sport (Written for the final credits of the Russian sports movie Moving Up)

Concerto 
 1955: Trumpet Concerto
 1972: Concerto for Orchestra (based on the ballet Illumination, staged in 1974, Bolshoi Theatre, Moscow).

Cantata 
 Beautiful as youth, country
1953: Vasily Turkin
1962: Red Pathfinders
1972: Squad Songs

Overtures 
 1957: Youth
1958: Thuringia
1967: Merry Girls
1967: Russian Holiday, for the orchestra of Russian folk instruments

Instrumental 

 The Rhythms of Time
Carnival
Auftakt
Robinsonade (from the film "My Love in the Third Year of Study")
Heart in the palm
A moment of luck
Morning big city
Elegy (from the film O Sport, You Are Peace!)

Recordings 

 1971: Concerto for Orchestra in E Major (USSR State Academic Symphony Orchestra, under Evgeny Svetlanov)
 1985: Marshal Zhukov March (from film "Battle of Moscow," Central Military band of Ministry of Defence of USSR, under Colonel Anatoly Maltsev)
 2015: Concerto for solo Trumpet and Orchestra (Trumpet Records, Timofei Aleksandrovich Dokschitzer)
 2019: Anniversary Concert for Aleksandra Pakhmutova (Bolshoi Theater, under Mikhail Pletnev and Yuri Bashmet)

Honors and awards
Soviet and Russian
Hero of Socialist Labour № 21035 (29 October 1990) – for outstanding contributions to the development of Soviet musical art and productive social activities
Two Orders of Lenin № ****** & № 460143 (6 November 1979 and 29 October 1990)
Order of St. Andrew (28 October 2019)
Order "For Merit to the Fatherland";
1st class (9 November 2009) – for outstanding contribution to the development of national musical art, and many years of creative activity
2nd class (27 December 1999) – for great personal contribution to the development of musical art
3rd class (29 September 2014) – for great contribution to the development of domestic musical art and achieved creative success
Order of the Red Banner of Labour, twice (1967, 1971)
Order of Friendship of Peoples (1986)
State Prize of the Russian Federation (12 June 2015)
USSR State Prize (1975) – for the songs of recent years (1971–1974)
USSR State Prize (1982) – for the music for the film "O Sport, You – the world" (1981)
Lenin Komsomol Prize (1966) – a song cycle about youth and the Komsomol Prize of the Union State of Russia and Belarus for literary and artistic works that make a significant contribution to strengthening the relations of brotherhood, friendship and comprehensive cooperation between the countries – members of the Union State (10 March 2004)
Honored Art Worker of the RSFSR (1971)
People's Artist of the RSFSR (1977)
People's Artist of the USSR (1984)
Honorary Citizen of Volgograd (19 October 1993)
Honorary Citizen of Bratsk (26 August 1994)
Honorary citizen of Moscow (13 September 2000)

Foreign
Order of Francysk Skaryna (Belarus, 3 April 2000) – for outstanding work on the development and strengthening of the Belarusian-Russian cultural relations

Public
Order of St. Euphrosyne, Grand Duchess of Moscow, 2nd class (Russian Orthodox Church, 2008)
The title "Living Legend" by the national Russian award "Ovation" (2002)
The award "Russian National Olympus" (2004)

|-
! colspan="3" style="background: red;" | Ovation
|-

|-

References

External links

Official website 
 

1929 births
20th-century women composers
21st-century women composers
Living people
Musicians from Volgograd
Moscow Conservatory alumni
Heroes of Socialist Labour
People's Artists of the RSFSR
People's Artists of the USSR
Recipients of the Lenin Komsomol Prize
Recipients of the Order "For Merit to the Fatherland", 1st class
Recipients of the Order "For Merit to the Fatherland", 2nd class
Recipients of the Order "For Merit to the Fatherland", 3rd class
Recipients of the Order of Francysk Skaryna
Recipients of the Order of Friendship of Peoples
Recipients of the Order of Lenin
Recipients of the Order of the Red Banner of Labour
State Prize of the Russian Federation laureates
Recipients of the USSR State Prize
Russian women classical composers
Russian classical composers
Russian women composers
Russian film score composers
Soviet women classical composers
Soviet women composers
Soviet film score composers